Robley D. Evans may refer to:
 Robley D. Evans (admiral), United States Navy admiral
 Robley D. Evans (physicist), American physicist

See also
 Robley Dunglison, English-American physician, medical educator and author